An audition website is a web site that aggregates audition information and delivers this information via the World Wide Web. There are hundreds of companies that operate acting, modeling, and dancing audition websites. The primary organization of professional screen and theater casting in the United States is the Casting Society of America (CSA). 

Originally, only talent agents were able to provide actors, models, dancers, and other performers with audition information. Today, both open auditions and private auditions can be found on reliable audition websites. 

Audition websites are an integral component in the employment statistics of actors and other industry professionals.  Most acting assignments are typically short term and range from 1 day to a few months. 

Some audition websites require membership and others are free to use. Most all audition websites involve the member regularly browsing audition listings and "self-submitting" for auditions. This enables members to choose the types of jobs that they audition for. Other than membership dues, audition websites do not charge other fees or take a percentage of income earned from jobs. Audition websites have grown in popularity and the most visited audition websites have memberships in the millions. A casting director, talent agent, film producer, or movie director can use Audition websites to locate performers for casting. These industry professionals use audition websites to find talent for commercials, music videos, movies, and other entertainment projects.

See also 

 Casting (performing arts)

References

External links 
 Screen Actors Guild - Professional Actors Union; Offers information for beginning actors, a member directory, and customized tools.
 The Actors Studio - Professional Actors Organization; A non-profit organization for professional actors, directors, and playwrights established in 1947. Offers performers an audition-based membership for life.
 Actors Equity - Union that represents American theatre actors and stage managers.
 Actors Inequity - A website that supports non-union and non-paid performers.

Websites
Performing arts